Vladan Marković (Serbian Cyrillic: Владан Марковић; born 20 March 1977 in Belgrade, Yugoslavia with height 1.87 cm and weight 90 kg) is a Serbian swimmer also considered to be one of the country's all-time best. He is the current president of PK Zlatni Delfin, a swimming club from Belgrade and is a University of Belgrade alumni since 2001.

Marković represented his country at three different Summer Olympics. He made his first appearance at the 1996 Summer Olympics which were held in the city of Atlanta, United States of America. Marković finished 28th overall at the men's 100 m butterfly with a time of 54.90. He also finished 28th overall at the men's 200 metre butterfly with a time of 2:01.80. At the 2000 Summer Olympics in Sydney, Australia, his results were very similar. Markovic could only establish a time of 2:00.02 and was eliminated after the preliminary heat in the men's 200 metre butterfly. Finally, at the 2004 Summer Olympics in Athens, Greece, his time of 2:04.77 at the men's 200 metre butterfly was only good enough for a 31st overall place.

Marković represented Serbia at the 2008 Summer Olympics in Beijing, People's Republic of China, which was his fourth Olympics. He gained his qualification in Cadiz, Spain in 2007 with a time of 2:00.36 at the 200 metre butterfly.

Marković won three bronze medals at the Mediterranean Games from 1997 to 2001. Among his best results remain the 7th-place finish at the 1995 FINA Short Course World Championships in Rio de Janeiro, Brazil, and his 9th-place finish at the 2000 FINA Short Course World Championships in Athens, Greece. He has reached the semifinals six times at various European LC Championships. On top of everything, he has been crowned Balkans champion four times during his career (1996-1998-2000-2002).

He has been Serbia's butterfly national champion for the past 15 years and retains the title still to this day. Marković was selected for the best young athlete in Yugoslavia in 1995.

See also
List of swimmers

External links
Profile at Olympic Committee of Serbia
 
 
 
 

Serbian male swimmers
Olympic swimmers of Yugoslavia
Swimmers at the 1996 Summer Olympics
Swimmers at the 2000 Summer Olympics
Swimmers at the 2004 Summer Olympics
Swimmers at the 2008 Summer Olympics
Male butterfly swimmers
Sportspeople from Belgrade
Living people
Olympic swimmers of Serbia and Montenegro
Olympic swimmers of Serbia
Yugoslav male swimmers
Mediterranean Games bronze medalists for Yugoslavia
Swimmers at the 1997 Mediterranean Games
Swimmers at the 2001 Mediterranean Games
Year of birth missing (living people)
Mediterranean Games medalists in swimming